Harewood is the name of a lake and a plain of the Canadian province of British Columbia. It is located in Nanaimo, on the east coast of Vancouver Island. Its geographical coordinates are  The name has been in use since at least 1913, when Harewood referred to a small mining village in the area, no longer existing, having been overtaken by Nanaimo. The mine was owned in part by the seventh son of Henry Lascelles, 3rd Earl of Harewood who served on the BC coast as captain of the gunboat HMS Forward and set up the Harewood Coal Mining Company to work deposits he acquired.

Today, the name "Harewood" is used to refer to a neighbourhood in south Nanaimo and surrounding community.

Community services such as schools and fire departments used to use "Harewood" in their names before broadly amalgamating with the City of Nanaimo.

The Harewood area also encompasses the site of the Nanaimo Armoury, Vancouver Island University, Headquarters of Nanaimo Search and Rescue and the Colliery Dams walking trails.

"Harewood" also used as a street name and as a name for some other community amenities.

Harewood School
Until 2016, the original Harewood School stood in Harewood at 505 Howard Street. Built in 1914, the school was closed in 2004. Until its demolition, it was Nanaimo's oldest school still standing. It was registered of historical value, but fell into disrepair from lack of use.

The school was torn down in the spring of 2016. All that remains is the detached gymnasium.

Harewood Mall

References

Ghost towns in British Columbia
Populated places in the Regional District of Nanaimo
Neighbourhoods in Nanaimo